Geng Xianglong (born 26 June 2003) is a Chinese footballer currently playing as a defender for Ji'nan Xingzhou in China League Two.

Career statistics

Club
.

References

2003 births
Living people
Chinese footballers
Association football defenders
Nantong Zhiyun F.C. players
21st-century Chinese people